The 1973–74 Carolina Cougars season was the 5th and final season of the Cougars in the American Basketball Association. Billy Cunningham (who had been named the MVP the previous season), Dennis Wuycik, and Mike Lewis were hobbled by injuries through the season, which meant the team struggled to gain much ground in the Division, though they finished consistently enough to qualify for a playoff spot for the 2nd straight season. The Cougars finished 2nd in points scored, with 110.5 per game, but 6th in points allowed with 107.0 per game. The team was 26–16 by the midpoint of the season (with a seven-game winning streak in the middle of it), while going 21–21 for the second half of the season. The biggest losing streak by the team was 6, done near the end of the season, but by that point they had clinched the third spot in the playoffs, finishing 19 games above Virginia, who they beat in their final regular season game at home, 99–91. Once again, the Cougars faced the Kentucky Colonels in the playoffs, but once again the Colonels prevailed, this time in a First Round sweep. This turned out to be the final game the Cougars played. Owner Tedd Munchak sold the team after the season ended to a group of New York businessmen, which included Harry Weltman, Donald Schupak, Ozzie Silna and Daniel Silna for $1.5 million. The team subsequently moved to St. Louis to become the Spirits of St. Louis, playing for two seasons.

During the regular season, the Cougars played 21 games in Greensboro, 14 in Charlotte, and 7 in Raleigh; in the playoffs, the team played once in Greensboro, and once in Charlotte.

Roster 
 27 Joe Caldwell - Small forward 
 20 Mack Calvin - Point guard 
 53 Jim Chones - Center
 32 Billy Cunningham - Small forward 
 21 Steve Jones - Shooting guard 
 42 Mike Lewis - Center 
 23 Gene Littles - Point guard 
 22 Ed Manning - Small forward 
 24 Ted McClain - Shooting guard 
 52 Tom Owens - Power forward 
 31 Marv Roberts - Power forward 
 14 Ollie Taylor - Shooting guard 
 44 Dennis Wuycik - Small forward

Final standings

Eastern Division

Playoffs
Eastern Division Semifinals

Cougars lose series, 4–0

Awards and honors
1974 ABA All-Star Game selections (game played on January 30, 1974)
 Mack Calvin
 Ted McClain

References

 Cougars on Basketball Reference

External links
 RememberTheABA.com 1973-74 regular season and playoff results
 RememberTheABA.com Carolina Cougars page

Carolina Cougars
Carolina
Carolina Cougars, 1973-74
Carolina Cougars, 1973-74